Kvarnholmen is a peninsula east of Stockholm, Sweden. It used to only be connected in the south-west, but a permanent bridge now connects it in the south-east to the rest of Nacka, a municipality of greater Stockholm.

Nacka Municipality